January 2014 winter storm may refer to:

 2014 North American cold wave (disambiguation)
 2014 Gulf Coast winter storm
 Winter storms of 2013-2014 in the United Kingdom